Kiss: The Series (Kiss: The Series – ) is a 2016 Thai television series starring Jirakit Thawornwong (Mek), Lapassalan Jiravechsoontornkul (Mild), Sattaphong Phiangphor (Tao), Worranit Thawornwong (Mook).

Directed by Chatkaew Susiwa and produced by GMMTV, the series premiered on GMM 25 and LINE TV on 10 January 2016, airing on Sundays at 20:00 ICT and 22:00 ICT, respectively. The series concluded on 24 April 2016.

Cast and characters 
Below are the cast of the series:

Main 
 Jirakit Thawornwong (Mek) as Thada
 Lapassalan Jiravechsoontornkul (Mild) as Sandee
 Sattaphong Phiangphor (Tao) as Na
 Worranit Thawornwong (Mook) as Sanrak

Supporting 
 Noelle Klinneam (Tiny) as Khun Jane
 Tawan Vihokratana (Tay) as Pete
 Thitipoom Techaapaikhun (New) as Kao
 Nachat Juntapun (Nicky) as June
 Phakjira Kanrattanasood (Nanan) as Ella
 Pop Khamgasem as Chacha
 Kunchanuj Kengkarnka (Kan) as Thew
 Sivakorn Lertchuchot (Guy) as First
 Korawit Boonsri (Gun) as Noina
 Rita Ramnarong (Chacha) as Fahsai
 Apichaya Saejung (Ciize) as May/Mail

Soundtracks

References

External links 
 Kiss: The Series on LINE TV
 
 GMMTV

Television series by GMMTV
Thai romantic comedy television series
Thai drama television series
2016 Thai television series debuts
2016 Thai television series endings
GMM 25 original programming